The Bortne Tunnel is a road tunnel in Bremanger Municipality in Vestland county, Norway.

The tunnel was built as part of a large project to connect the islands of Bremangerlandet and Frøya to the mainland with a direct connection to the municipal center of Svelgen.  This tunnel is the final leg of this project.  After this tunnel opened, the ferry connection from Smørhamn to Kjelkenes (across the Frøysjøen strait) was discontinued.

References

Bremanger
Road tunnels in Vestland